Farragut is a suburban town located in Knox and Loudon counties in the State of Tennessee, United States. The town's population was 23,506 at the 2020 census. It is included in the Knoxville Metropolitan Area. The town is named in honor of Hispanic American and Union Admiral David Farragut, who was born just east of Farragut at Campbell's Station in 1801, and fought in the American Civil War.

History
The area was originally known as Campbell's Station after a fort and stage coach station  erected by Captain David Campbell (1753–1832) in 1787. The brick Campbell's Station Inn was built in 1810 and still stands on Kingston Pike within sight of the Farragut Town Hall. The Civil War Battle of Campbell's Station was fought there on November 16, 1863.

The historic unincorporated village of Concord (listed on the National Register of Historic Places) was founded in 1854 just east of what would become the eastern boundary of Farragut. Concord is located on the main rail line to Atlanta and main channel of the Tennessee River, and was an important transloading center for the Tennessee marble industry in the late 19th century. Picturesque buildings and antebellum homes sit along the river, as well as several very old churches.

The original Farragut High School was built by the community in 1904, and moved to its current location in 1976. Some parts of Farragut are zoned for Hardin Valley Academy in the neighboring suburb of Hardin Valley, built in 2008.

In early December 1979, the Knoxville City Council would vote to annex right-of-way acreage of I-40 in the Farragut area, prompting community residents to petition an incorporation election. On January 16, 1980, Farragut would vote to incorporate as a town preventing further annexation by Knoxville, which was trying to shore up its tax base by annexing affluent communities along Kingston Pike. The effort was led by a group of citizens who called themselves the Farragut Community Group. The first mayor, Bob Leonard, was elected April 1, 1980, along with four aldermen. Alderman Eddy Ford became mayor in 1993 and served in that position until April 2009, when he failed to win re-election, losing to Dr. Ralph McGill, another of the original founders of the town government.

Geography
Farragut is located at  (35.877511, -84.173548). According to the United States Census Bureau, the town has a total area of 16.2 square miles (42.1 km2), of which 16.1 square miles (41.7 km2) is land and 0.2 square mile (0.4 km2) (1.05%) is water.

The town of Farragut is bound to the north by I-40/75, except at Campbell Station Road, Snyder Road, and the Outlets Drive area; to the south by Turkey Creek Road and the Norfolk Southern Railroad line; to the west at the Loudon County line; and to the east by Lovell Road (on the north side of Kingston Pike and Thornton Heights) and Concord Hills subdivisions (on the south side of Kingston Pike).

Farragut is situated in a hilly area between Blackoak Ridge to the north and the Tennessee River (Fort Loudoun Lake) to the south. Its municipal area is mostly located south of the merged Interstate 40 (I-40)/I-75, with the exception of a few neighborhoods. Kingston Pike, a merged stretch of U.S. Route 70 (US 70) and US 11, traverses the town. Concord lies immediately southeast of Farragut, and Hardin Valley lies opposite Blackoak Ridge to the north. The unincorporated community of Dixie Lee Junction lies along Kingston Pike, just across the Loudon County line.

Demographics

2020 census

As of the 2020 United States census, there were 23,506 people, 8,657 households, and 6,744 families residing in the town.

2000 census
As of the census of 2000, there were 17,720 people, 6,333 households, and 5,231 families residing in the town. The population density was 1,101.5 people per square mile (425.2/km2). There were 6,628 housing units at an average density of 412.0 per square mile (159.0/km2). The racial makeup of the town was 93.88% White, 1.80% African American, 0.15% Native American, 3.16% Asian, 0.33% from other races, and 0.69% from two or more races. Hispanic or Latino of any race were 1.07% of the population.

There were 6,333 households, out of which 39.4% had children under the age of 18 living with them, 76.0% were married couples living together, 5.0% had a female householder with no husband present, and 17.4% were non-families. 15.2% of all households were made up of individuals, and 5.5% had someone living alone who was 65 years of age or older. The average household size was 2.76 and the average family size was 3.08.

In the town, the population was spread out, with 26.7% under the age of 18, 5.3% from 18 to 24, 24.4% from 25 to 44, 32.2% from 45 to 64, and 11.4% who were 65 years of age or older. The median age was 42 years. For every 100 females, there were 97.8 males. For every 100 females age 18 and over, there were 94.4 males.

The median income for a household in the town was $82,726, and the median income for a family was $91,423. Males had a median income of $70,873 versus $34,955 for females. The per capita income for the town was $35,830. About 2.6% of families and 2.9% of the population were below the poverty line, including 2.9% of those under age 18 and 4.1% of those age 65 or over.

According to the 2007 official Census Bureau estimates, median household income and median family income had risen to $94,420 and $108,236 respectively.

Historic sites
 Avery Russell House

Education

These schools are a part of Knox County Schools.

Elementary schools for Farragut:
Farragut Primary School (K-2)
Farragut Intermediate School (3-5)

Most of Farragut is zoned to the following:
Farragut Middle School (6-8)
Farragut High School (9-12)

Although the schools are not in the town limits, Hardin Valley Middle School serves parts of Farragut north of Interstate 75 for grades 6-8, and Hardin Valley Academy serves that same portion for grades 9-12.

There is a private school, Knoxville Christian School.

Notable people
Bill Bates, NFL player
Tyson Clabo, NFL player
Nicky Delmonico, Major League Baseball player
David Farragut, Civil War (Union) admiral 
Robert Ben Garant, actor, comedian, writer, director, and producer
Michael McKenry, Major League Baseball player
Tim Priest, attorney and Vol Network color commentator
Archibald Roane, second Governor of Tennessee
Jerry Sisk Jr., co-founder of Jewelry Television
Kyle Waldrop, Major League Baseball player

Media
WFIV-FM
Farragut Press

References

Further reading
 Angel, Margaret. Not So Long Ago, In the Concord-Farragut Area : Stories, Paintings and Sketches. (M. Angel, 1986).

External links

 
 Convention and Visitors Bureau
 Municipal Technical Advisory Service entry for Farragut  – information on local government, elections, and link to charter

 
Towns in Knox County, Tennessee
Towns in Loudon County, Tennessee
Towns in Tennessee
Tennessee
Knoxville metropolitan area
1787 establishments in North Carolina
Populated places established in 1787
Tennessee populated places on the Tennessee River